The Black-red-green coalition, also known as the Kenya coalition is a term in German politics describing a governing coalition among the parties of the Christian Democratic Union (CDU), Social Democratic Party (SPD) and the Green Party. The name comes from the traditional colours of the parties, with the CDU represented by black, the SPD by red, and the Greens by green. As these are also the colours of the Kenyan and Afghan flags, the names of these countries are sometimes applied to the arrangement, in the same manner as the black-yellow-green "Jamaica coalition".

History 
The government formed following the 2016 Saxony-Anhalt state election was the first such black-red-green coalition government formation in Germany. Two more such coalitions were formed after the 2019 Brandenburg state election and 2019 Saxony state elections, which took place on the same day. In Brandenburg, the coalition is led by the SPD, while in Saxony, it is led by the CDU.

See also 
 German governing coalition
Grand coalition
 Jamaica coalition (politics)
 Red–green alliance
 Red–red coalition
 Red-red-green coalition
 Social–liberal coalition
 Traffic light coalition

References 

Alliance 90/The Greens
Christian Democratic Union of Germany
Social Democratic Party of Germany